Mihaela Pohoaţă (born 28 October 1981 in Fălticeni, Romania) is a Romanian aerobic gymnast. During her career she won five world championships medals (three gold and two bronze) and three European championships gold medals. She is a two time world bronze medalist on the individual event.

2000-2005 she graduated the University of Education and Sports "Ovidius Costanta", with the specialization in Artistic Gymnastic. 
2007-2009 she qualifies as an International coach of Aerobic Gymnastics with UEG.
10.05.2021 she completed her Master as a Pharmacy Assistant.

References

External links
Federation Internationale de Gymnastique Profiles: Mihaela Pohoaţă

1981 births
Living people
People from Fălticeni
Romanian aerobic gymnasts
Female aerobic gymnasts
Medalists at the Aerobic Gymnastics World Championships